Erbessa lamasi is a moth of the family Notodontidae first described by James S. Miller in 2008. It is found in south-eastern Peru.

The length of the forewings is 16 mm for males. The forewings are dark coppery brown, but darker gray brown toward the outer margin. The central area of the hindwing is immaculate white. There are scattered dark gray scales at the base and a wide black to dark charcoal-gray band along the outer margin. The surface of this band is slightly iridescent blue.

The larvae possibly feed on Miconia species.

Etymology
The species is named in honor of Gerardo Lamas Muller, director of the Museo de Historia Natural, Lima, Peru, and curator in the Departamento de Entomologıa.

References

Moths described in 2008
Notodontidae of South America